The tiger pistol shrimp (Alpheus bellulus) belongs to the family of snapping shrimp.

Description
The tiger pistol shrimp can grow to a size up to 4 to 5 cm, not including antennae. The body is stout and opaque. The background color of the body is yellowish white or plain yellow. The patterns drawn on the cephalothorax, abdomen and tail are irregular but symmetric, their coloration varies from light brown, brownish purple to brownish orange. The legs are banded with the same colors as the body and are covered with short bristles. The antennae are red.
The chelipeds are also banded, with the right being bigger and modified into a powerful weapon. By closing at extreme speed, the cheliped expels an air bubble at more than  towards the prey. This action is accompanied with a loud bang. This powerful sonic weapon creates a violent shock wave which can kill or knock out prey, which could be another shrimp or a small fish passing close to the tiger pistol shrimp.
The sound emitted from the collapsing bubble can be up to 218 decibels, with a temperature of up to 4,800 degrees celsius, slightly cooler than the surface of the sun.

Distribution
The tiger pistol shrimp can be found in tropical waters of the Indo-West Pacific area.

Habitat
The tiger pistol shrimp dwells in sandy, muddy and detrital substratum in shallow waters until 20m.

Feeding
The tiger pistol shrimp is a carnivore, preying primarily on small invertebrates. It may also eat detritus and macroalgae, and will scavenge carcasses near its burrow. If it has formed a symbiotic relationship with a goby, the goby may bring it food. In aquaria, it is sometimes blamed for the death of fish, but it is very unlikely that it possesses the strength or willingness to attack fish for food. It can be fed many common foods given to aquarium shrimps, such as flakes, pellets, and most frozen foods, and will generally take prepared foods with no training required.

Behaviour
The tiger pistol shrimp lives in burrows in  symbiosis with certain goby species such as Cryptocentrus cinctus, Amblyeleotris guttata or Stonogobiops yasha. The shrimp digs and maintains the burrows which are the dens for both animals, while the goby acts as a watchman, warning of danger the shrimp cannot see due to poor eyesight. Proven from a study, in an environment where goby fish and the tiger pistol shrimp are kept together, specifically in a tank, if there is no food source for the shrimp, the shrimp maintains its diet by consuming the feces of the goby fish from its burrow to survive. Hence, another example of their partnership.

In aquaria
The tiger pistol shrimp is one of the most popular pistol shrimp in the marine aquarium hobby as it has a peaceful temperament, is inexpensive and does not require complicated care.

Original publication
Miya, Y. & S. Miyake, 1969. Description of Alpheus bellulus sp. nov. associated with gobies from Japan (Crustacea, Decapoda, Alpheidae).— Publications from the Seto Marine Biological Laboratory 16: 307–314.

References

External links
 

Alpheidae
Crustaceans described in 1969